Nothing to Hide is a 1981 American pornographic film  starring John Leslie and Richard Pacheco. The film was directed by Anthony Spinelli and is a spin-off of Spinelli's Talk Dirty to Me. Nothing to Hide was followed by two sequels Justine (1993) and Nothing to Hide 3 (1999).

Plot
The story revolves around two best friends, Jack and Lenny, with different personalities, who are looking for some sexual adventures.

Cast
 John Leslie as Jack
 Richard Pacheco as Lenny
 Erica Boyer as Karenda 
 Elizabeth Randolph as Elizabeth
 Richard Dove as Elizabeth's Husband
 Jack Hoffey as Hot Dog Stand Owner

Reception
Nothing to Hide was nominated and won several awards, including six AFAA Awards in the categories of Best Picture, Best Director, Best Supporting Actress (for Holly McCall), Best Supporting Actor (for Richard Pacheco), Best Cinematography (for Jack Remy), and Best Advertising Campaign (for Jimmie Johnson). Additionally, the film got another nomination in the Best Supporting Actress category (for Tigr), but lost it. It received four nominations - Best Picture, Best Director, Best Actor (for John Leslie), and Best Screenplay, and won Best Supporting Actor (for Pacheco) in the AVN Award, and one Critics' Adult Film Awards for Best Actor (for Pacheco).

References

External links
 

1980 films
1980s pornographic films
American pornographic films
1980s English-language films
1980s American films